Pars-e Jonubi-ye Do (also Romanized as Pārs-e Jonūbī-ye Do) is a village in Central District, Asaluyeh County, Bushehr Province, Iran. At the 2006 census, its population was 14,006, in 952 families.

References 

Populated places in Asaluyeh County